is amongst the Kiso Mountains,  located in the Kiso District, Nagano Prefecture, in the Chūbu region of Japan. There is the "Sannosawa cirque". Glacial expansion has created a gully, just underneath the cirque. A lot of Alpine plant grow naturally. Name River and Ina River (Tributary of Kiso River) that become the sources flow to the Ise Bay of Pacific Ocean. There is the tributary called "Sannosawa" around Mount Sannosawa. Komagatake Ropeway is used to climb.

Scenery of Mount Sannosawa

See also

 Kiso Mountains
 List of mountains in Japan

References

Kiso Mountains
Japan Alps
Sannosawa, Mount